Maihar State was a princely state in India during the British Raj, located in what is today Madhya Pradesh, central India. 
The state, which was watered by the Tons River, consists mainly of alluvial soil covering sandstone, and is fertile except in the hilly district of the south. A large area was under forest, the produce of which provided a small export trade.

The state gained India-wide and later, worldwide fame for Maihar gharana,  a gharana or school of Indian classical music. It is one of the most prominent gharanas of the 20th century; much of the fame of Hindustani classical music in the west stems from this gharana.

History
The state was founded in 1778. From 1788 to 1790 Maihar State was occupied by Banda. The state became a princely state of British India in the early 19th century, and was administered as part of Bundelkhand Agency in the Central India Agency. In 1871 the eastern states of Bundelkhand Agency, including Maihar, were separated to form the new Bagelkhand Agency in Central India. In 1933 Maihar, along with ten other states in western Bagelkhand, were transferred back to the Bundelkhand Agency.

The state suffered severely from famine in 1896–1897. Extensive ruins of shrines and other buildings surround the town. As of 1940 it had a population of 79,558 and an area of 412 square miles.
In 1948 Maihar was merged into India.

The legendary Indian musician Ustad Allauddin Khan was the court musician for Maharaja Brijnath Singh of Maihar. Here he laid the foundation of a modern Maihar gharana by developing a number of ragas, combining the bass sitar and bass sarod with more traditional instruments and setting up an orchestra. In 1907, he established the Maihar Band, an orchestral group that was taught music to orphaned children.

Rulers
The state was ruled by Kachhwaha Clan of Rajputs.

Thakurs  
1778 – 1788                Beni Singh                         (b. 1719 – d. 1788) 
1788 – 1790                Rajdhar Singh                      (b. c.1765 – d. 1790) 
1790 – 1825                Durjan Singh                       (b. 1766 – d. 1825) 
1826 – 1850                Bishan Singh                       (b. 1797 – d. 18..) 
1850 – 1852                Mohan Prasad                       (b. 1816 – d. 1852) 
1852 – 1869                Raghubir Singh                     (b. 1843 – d. 1908) 
1852 – 1865                .... -Regent

Rajas  
1869 – 1908                Raghubir Singh                     (s.a.) 
1908 –  7 Jan 1910         Jagubir Singh                      (b. 1864 – d. 1910) 
 7 Jan 1910 – 15 Dec 1911  Randhir Singh                      (b. 1865 – d. 1911) 
16 Dec 1911 – 15 Aug 1968  HH Maharaja Brijnath Singh Ju Deo                    (b. 1896 – d. 1968)
15 Aug 1968 –         HH Maharaja Govind Singh

References

External links
Maihar Heritage Palace & Fort

Princely states of India
Princely states of Madhya Pradesh
Rajputs
States and territories disestablished in 1948
1778 establishments in India
1948 disestablishments in India
States and territories established in 1778